Kimball is an unincorporated community located in the town of Kimball, Iron County, Wisconsin, United States.

History
A post office called Kimball was established in 1889, and remained in operation until it was discontinued in 1942. The community was named for Alanson M. Kimball, member of the U.S. House of Representatives from Wisconsin's 6th district.

References

Unincorporated communities in Iron County, Wisconsin
Unincorporated communities in Wisconsin